Ekhane Aamar Swarga is a 1990 Bengali film directed by Jahar Biswas and produced by K. C. N. Chandrasekhar. The film's music was composed by R. D. Burman.

Cast
 Soumitra Chatterjee
 Tapas Paul
 Deepika Chikhalia
 Sumitra Mukherjee
 Shakuntala Barua

References

External links
 Ekhane Aamar Swarga at the Gomolo

Bengali-language Indian films
1990 films
1990s Bengali-language films